Melanoplus nigrescens, known generally as dark-sided grasshopper, is a species of spur-throated grasshopper in the family Acrididae. Other common names include the black-sided spur-throat grasshopper and black-sided locust. It is found in North America.

References

Melanoplinae
Articles created by Qbugbot
Insects described in 1877